John E. Cort (born 1953) is an American indologist. He is a professor of Asian and Comparative Religions at Denison University, where he is also Chair of the Department of Religion. He has studied Jainism and the history of Jain society over four decades, authored several books on Jainism, and is one of the editors of the forthcoming Brill Encyclopedia of Jainism. According to a review published in 2006 by Peter Flügel, the influence of the studies and publications of Cort on Jainism "have been immense", and in some respects dominated the field of Jain studies.

Cort's studies have also included those on comparative Indology, such as a comparison of caste systems in Jainism and Hinduism.

Cort has a BA (1974) and MA (1982)  in South Asian Studies from the University of Wisconsin and an AM (1984) and PhD (1989) from Harvard University.

References

External links

1953 births
Living people
University of Wisconsin–Madison College of Letters and Science alumni
Harvard University alumni
Denison University faculty
American Indologists
Scholars of Jainism